The 1993 Cheltenham Gold Cup was a horse race that took place at Cheltenham on Thursday March 18, 1993. It was the 66th running of the Cheltenham Gold Cup, and it was won by Jodami. The winner was ridden by Mark Dwyer and trained by Peter Beaumont. The pre-race favourite The Fellow finished fourth.

Jodami was the first winner of the Gold Cup trained in northern England since The Thinker in 1987.

Cherrykino who died as a result of his fall was the last remaining relative of Arkle.

Race details
 Sponsor: Tote
 Winner's prize money: £99,448.00
 Going: Good to Firm
 Number of runners: 16
 Winner's time: 6m 34.6s

Full result

* The distances between the horses are shown in lengths or shorter. PU = pulled-up.† Trainers are based in Great Britain unless indicated.

Winner's details
Further details of the winner, Jodami:

 Foaled: 1985 in Ireland
 Sire: Crash Course; Dam: Masterstown Lucy (Bargello)
 Owner: John Yeadon
 Breeder: Eamon Phelan

References
 
 independent.co.uk – "Jodami power fuels northern Gold rush" – March 19, 1993.

Cheltenham Gold Cup
 1993
Cheltenham Gold Cup
Cheltenham Gold Cup
1990s in Gloucestershire